Göksu Dam is a dam on Göksu Stream south of Diyarbakır city in Turkey. Constructed between 1987 and 1991, the development was backed by the Turkish State Hydraulic Works.

See also
List of dams and reservoirs in Turkey

References
Notes

Sources
Göksu Dam, State Hydraulic Works (Turkey), Retrieved December 16, 2009

Dams in Diyarbakır Province
Rock-filled dams
Dams completed in 1991
1991 establishments in Turkey